Thérèse de France (Marie Thérèse Félicité; 16 May 1736 – 28 September 1744) was a French princess, a fille de France, as the daughter of King Louis XV of France and Marie Leszczyńska.

Biography

Princess Marie Thérèse Félicité of France was born at the Palace of Versailles in France. She was the seventh daughter and ninth child of King Louis XV of France and his Polish-born consort Marie Leszczyńska. Known as Madame Sixième from her birth, she was later baptised Marie-Thérèse-Félicité and was known as Madame Thérèse. 

As the daughter of a king of France, she was a fille de France (daughter of France). This rank allowed her the style of Royal Highness, and she was the most important lady at court after her mother and her elder sisters. However, daughters of the king were usually known as Madame followed by their baptismal name. In the case of Louis XV's daughters, when they were young, their baptismal name was replaced by an ordinal number as per their "arrival"; accordingly, Madame Thérèse was Madame Sixième, as the sixth daughter. 

When she was barely two years old, Thérése was taken to the Royal Abbey of Fontevraud in the Anjou province of France. This was done because Cardinal Fleury, the king’s chief minister, thought that the cost of raising them in Versailles would be too expensive with all the luxuries they were entitled to. She left with her sisters Princess Victoire of France (1733–1799), Princess Sophie of France (1734–1782) and Princess Louise of France (1737–1787). The princesses left Versailles on 6 June 1738, accompanied by a furniture and military escort.

During her childhood, Thérése was often ill, and her governess noted that it was probably due to the warm climate of the region. In mid-September 1744, Thérése fell ill with smallpox. On 27 September, she was baptised. Her nurse and valet stood in as godparents. She died the following day. She was eight years old and had never seen her parents since her arrival at Fontevraud.

Madame Thérèse was buried at the Abbey of Fontevraud, which, in earlier times, had been the traditional burial place of members of the House of Plantagenet.

Ancestry

References

Further reading
 Zieliński, Ryszard (1978). Polka na francuskim tronie. Czytelnik.

1736 births
1744 deaths
18th-century French women
People from Versailles
French people of Polish descent
Princesses of France (Bourbon)
Deaths from smallpox
Infectious disease deaths in France
Burials at Fontevraud Abbey
Children of Louis XV
Royalty and nobility who died as children
Daughters of kings